The International Journal of Computer Mathematics is a monthly peer-reviewed scientific journal covering numerical analysis and scientific computing. It was established in 1964 and is published by Taylor & Francis. The editors-in-chief are Choi-Hong Lai (University of Greenwich), Abdul Khaliq (Middle Tennessee State University), and Qin (Tim) Sheng (Baylor University). The collaborative sister journal International Journal of Computer Mathematics: Computer Systems Theory, covering the theory of computing and computer systems was established in 2016.

Abstracting and indexing

The journal is abstracted and indexed in the Science Citation Index Expanded, MathSciNet, and Scopus. According to the Journal Citation Reports, the journal has a 2018 impact factor of 1.196.

References

External links

International Journal of Computer Mathematics: Computer Systems Theory

Mathematics journals
Monthly journals
English-language journals
Taylor & Francis academic journals
Publications established in 1964
Computer science journals